XHHM-FM is a radio station on 90.5 FM in Ciudad Delicias, Chihuahua. The station is owned by GRD Multimedia and carries a grupera format known as La Caliente.

History
XHHM began as XEHM-AM 1480, receiving its concession on February 11, 1964. It was owned by Lilian Calderón de Guillemot and broadcast as a daytimer for most of its history. In 1976, operation was transferred to XEHM, S.A.

It migrated to FM in 2011.

References

External links
La Caliente 90.5 Facebook

Radio stations in Chihuahua